The 1979 Big Sky Conference men's basketball tournament was the fourth edition of the tournament, held March 2–3 at the Dee Events Center at Weber State College in Ogden, Utah.

Top-seeded Weber State defeated  in the championship game, 92–70, to clinch their second of three consecutive titles in the tournament. The Wildcats were in the first five finals, dropping the first two and winning the next three.

Format
First played in 1976, the Big Sky tournament had the same format for its first eight editions. The regular season champion hosted and only the top four teams from the standings took part, with seeding based on regular season conference records.

In their last season in the conference, Gonzaga tied for fourth in the standings (7–7) but did not qualify; they lost their final game to Boise State in overtime and were on the short end of the tiebreaker with Montana for the fourth seed.

Bracket

NCAA tournament
Weber State received an automatic bid to the expanded 40-team NCAA tournament, where they were seeded seventh in the Midwest region, the first time the Big Sky representative was not in the West region. The Wildcats defeated New Mexico State in overtime in the first round in Lawrence, Kansas, but were stopped by second-seeded Arkansas.

References

Big Sky Conference men's basketball tournament
Tournament
Big Sky Conference men's basketball tournament
Big Sky Conference men's basketball tournament
Basketball competitions in Ogden, Utah
College basketball tournaments in Utah